Beijing College Student Film Festival, first held in 1993, is an annual event organized by Beijing Normal University and Beijing Municipal Bureau of Radio, Film and Television. It is held in April or May, and is one of the biggest film festivals in China, along with Shanghai International Film Festival and Changchun Film Festival.

It awards several "Flying Tiger" Awards (Chinese: 飞虎) for jury award and students' choice award categories. The "favorite" categories always be the last announced in each ceremony.

Awards categories
Jury Award
Jury composed by college students, teachers, and film reviewers in Beijing.
Best Film
Best Director
Best Screenplay
Best Actor
Best Actress
Best Newcomer
Best Visual Effect
Best Directorial Debut
Grand Jury Prix

Students' Choice Award
National wide college students online votes (80% weight) and festival screenings (Beijing, Shanghai etc.) tickets votes (20% weight).
Favorite Actor
Favorite Actress
Favorite Director

Major Award Winners

See also 
 List of film festivals in China

References

External links
Official website
IMDb
China.org.cn-17th Beijing Student Film Festival

 
Film festivals in China
1993 establishments in China
Annual events in Beijing
Film festivals established in 1993
Spring (season) events in China